The following is a list of people pardoned by Bill Clinton. As president, Clinton used his power under the U.S. Constitution to grant pardons and clemency to 456 people, thus commuting the sentences of those already convicted of a crime, and obviating a trial for those not yet convicted. On January 20, 2001, he pardoned 140 people in the final hours of his presidency.

This list is a subset of the list of people pardoned or granted clemency by the president of the United States.

November 23, 1994

April 17, 1995

December 23, 1997

December 24, 1998

February 19, 1999

December 23, 1999

February 19, 2000

March 15, 2000

July 7, 2000

October 20, 2000

November 21, 2000

December 22, 2000

January 20, 2001

References

Presidency of Bill Clinton
+Clinton pardon
Pardoned by Clinton
Bill Clinton-related lists